The 2004–05 New York Rangers season was the franchise's 79th season; however, its games were cancelled as the 2004–05 NHL lockout could not be resolved in time.

Off-season
On July 6, 2004, it was announced that Tom Renney would remain the head coach of the Rangers.

Schedule
The Rangers preseason and regular season schedules were announced on July 13 and July 14, 2004, respectively.

|-
| 1 || September 23 || New York Islanders
|-
| 2 || September 26 || @ New York Islanders
|-
| 3 || September 28 || @ New Jersey Devils
|-
| 4 || September 30 || New Jersey Devils
|-
| 5 || October 2 || @ Boston Bruins
|-
| 6 || October 5 || Boston Bruins
|-
| 7 || October 6 || @ Columbus Blue Jackets
|-
| 8 || October 8 || @ Minnesota Wild
|-
| 9 || October 10 || @ Detroit Red Wings
|-

|-
| 1 || October 15 || Pittsburgh Penguins
|-
| 2 || October 16 || @ Pittsburgh Penguins
|-
| 3 || October 20 || Philadelphia Flyers
|-
| 4 || October 23 || Atlanta Thrashers
|-
| 5 || October 25 || San Jose Sharks
|-
| 6 || October 29 || @ Pittsburgh Penguins
|-
| 7 || October 30 || @ Toronto Maple Leafs
|-
| 8 || November 1 || Los Angeles Kings
|-
| 9 || November 3 || Boston Bruins
|-
| 10 || November 5 || Florida Panthers
|-
| 11 || November 6 || @ Ottawa Senators
|-
| 12 || November 8 || Nashville Predators
|-
| 13 || November 11 || Toronto Maple Leafs
|-
| 14 || November 13 || Buffalo Sabres
|-
| 15 || November 15 || @ New York Islanders
|-
| 16 || November 17 || @ Atlanta Thrashers
|-
| 17 || November 19 || @ Buffalo Sabres
|-
| 18 || November 20 || @ Montreal Canadiens
|-
| 19 || November 22 || New York Islanders
|-
| 20 || November 24 || @ Carolina Hurricanes
|-
| 21 || November 26 || @ Washington Capitals
|-
| 22 || November 28 || Pittsburgh Penguins
|-
| 23 || December 1 || @ New Jersey Devils
|-
| 24 || December 2 || @ Philadelphia Flyers
|-
| 25 || December 4 || New Jersey Devils
|-
| 26 || December 6 || Ottawa Senators
|-
| 27 || December 9 || Washington Capitals
|-
| 28 || December 11 || @ New Jersey Devils
|-
| 29 || December 12 || Boston Bruins
|-
| 30 || December 14 || @ Washington Capitals
|-
| 31 || December 17 || New York Islanders
|-
| 32 || December 18 || @ Philadelphia Flyers
|-
| 33 || December 21 || @ Atlanta Thrashers
|-
| 34 || December 23 || Florida Panthers
|-
| 35 || December 26 || @ Buffalo Sabres
|-
| 36 || December 31 || @ Florida Panthers
|-
| 37 || January 1 || @ Tampa Bay Lightning
|-
| 38 || January 3 || Anaheim Mighty Ducks
|-
| 39 || January 6 || Columbus Blue Jackets
|-
| 40 || January 8 || @ Boston Bruins
|-
| 41 || January 10 || Montreal Canadiens
|-
| 42 || January 13 || Phoenix Coyotes
|-
| 43 || January 15 || Pittsburgh Penguins
|-
| 44 || January 18 || @ Ottawa Senators
|-
| 45 || January 20 || New Jersey Devils
|-
| 46 || January 22 || Philadelphia Flyers
|-
| 47 || January 24 || St. Louis Blues
|-
| 48 || January 25 || @ New York Islanders
|-
| 49 || January 27 || Atlanta Thrashers
|-
| 50 || January 29 || @ Montreal Canadiens
|-
| 51 || February 2 || @ Vancouver Canucks
|-
| 52 || February 3 || @ Calgary Flames
|-
| 53 || February 5 || @ Edmonton Oilers
|-
| 54 || February 8 || Toronto Maple Leafs
|-
| 55 || February 10 || @ New Jersey Devils
|-
| 56 || February 16 || @ Minnesota Wild
|-
| 57 || February 17 || @ Columbus Blue Jackets
|-
| 58 || February 19 || Philadelphia Flyers
|-
| 59 || February 21 || Chicago Blackhawks
|-
| 60 || February 23 || Tampa Bay Lightning
|-
| 61 || February 26 || @ Pittsburgh Penguins
|-
| 62 || February 27 || Colorado Avalanche
|-
| 63 || March 2 || Carolina Hurricanes
|-
| 64 || March 5 || @ New York Islanders
|-
| 65 || March 7 || Washington Capitals
|-
| 66 || March 9 || @ Dallas Stars
|-
| 67 || March 11 || @ Anaheim Mighty Ducks
|-
| 68 || March 13 || @ San Jose Sharks
|-
| 69 || March 16 || New Jersey Devils
|-
| 70 || March 18 || Buffalo Sabres
|-
| 71 || March 19 || @ Toronto Maple Leafs
|-
| 72 || March 22 || Carolina Hurricanes
|-
| 73 || March 25 || New York Islanders
|-
| 74 || March 26 || @ Detroit Red Wings
|-
| 75 || March 28 || Montreal Canadiens
|-
| 76 || March 30 || @ Florida Panthers
|-
| 77 || March 31 || @ Tampa Bay Lightning
|-
| 78 || April 2 || @ Carolina Hurricanes
|-
| 79 || April 4 || Tampa Bay Lightning
|-
| 80 || April 6 || Ottawa Senators
|-
| 81 || April 7 || @ Philadelphia Flyers
|-
| 82 || April 9 || @ Boston Bruins
|-

Transactions
The Rangers were involved in the following transactions from June 8, 2004, the day after the deciding game of the 2004 Stanley Cup Finals, through February 16, 2005, the day the  season was officially cancelled.

Trades

Players acquired

Players lost

Signings

Draft picks
New York's picks at the 2004 NHL Entry Draft in Raleigh, North Carolina at the RBC Center.

Notes

References

New York Rangers seasons
New York Rangers
New York Rangers
New York Rangers
New York Rangers
 in Manhattan
Madison Square Garden